Scuderia Scribante, also known as Neville Lederle Team  and Lucky Strike Racing was a South African F1 entrant established in 1961. The team was co-founded by South African driver Neville Lederle and Aldo Scribante, an Italian immigrant who owned a construction company in Johannesburg. The team mostly competed in the South African Grand Prix from 1962 to 1975. After fielding a Lotus customer car, Scribante ran Jack Brabham on the occasion of the Rand Grand Prix in 1965. Brabham won the non-championship race, and Scribante agreed on switching to Brabham cars for the following two seasons. In 1970 Scribante returned to Lotus and purchased the Lotus 49 who had won the Formula One World Championship with Graham Hill in 1968. The very same year Dave Charlton won the South African Formula One Championship, the first of six consecutive titles. In 1972 the team decided to enter three European Formula One races with scarce results.

In 1975 Aldo Scribante founded the Aldo Scribante Circuit in Port Elizabeth.

Complete Formula One World Championship results
(key) (Results in bold indicate pole position; results in italics indicate fastest lap.)

References

Formula One entrants
South African auto racing teams
Auto racing teams established in 1961